Merrill A. Miller Jr., more commonly known as Pete Miller, was the chairman and chief executive officer of National Oilwell Varco, Inc. (NYSE:NOV) a supplier of oilfield services, equipment and components to the worldwide oil and natural gas industry. In November 2013, Miller announced he would step down as chairman and CEO in order to become the executive chairman of the firm’s spinoff distribution business, DistributionNow.com (NYSE:DNOW)  Since May 2015 he is also Chairman of the Swiss offshore drilling company Transocean.

Early life
Miller was born on July 4, 1950 in Burlington, Iowa, to Florence Mae and Merrill Miller Sr. He has three sisters Barbara, Lillian and Margette, and a late brother LaVerne. He is married to Peggy.

Education 
Miller graduated from Burlington High School in Iowa in 1968. He holds a Degree in Applied Science and Engineering from the U. S. Military Academy at West Point in 1972 and an MBA from Harvard Business School in 1980.

Career 
After graduation from West Point, he served in the U. S. Army for 5 years

May 1980 to January 1995, Miller served in various capacities including vice president of U.S. Operations of Helmerich & Payne International Drilling Co., a drilling contractor.

January 1995 to February 1996, he served as the president of Anadarko Drilling Company.

February 1996 to present, he has served in various executive capacities at National Oilwell Varco, Inc.  Miller has been a director of the Company since May 2001. He served as chairman of the board since July 22, 2005 and previously served as chairman from May 2002 through March 11, 2005. He served as the company’s chief operating officer from November 2000 through March 11, 2005. He has served as chief executive officer since May 2001. He served as president from November 2000 until December 2012.

Miller serves on the board of directors for Chesapeake Energy Corporation, Offshore Energy Center and Spindletop International. He formerly served on the board of directors for the Petroleum Equipment and Services Association.

Awards 
Morningstar Names Merrill A. (Pete) Miller Jr. of National Oilwell Varco as its 2012 CEO of the Year

References

External links 
 Forbes.com
 

American chief executives
United States Military Academy alumni
Harvard Business School alumni
1950 births
Living people